David Blair Redford (born July 27, 1983) is an American actor. He is known for his television roles such as Scotty Grainger on The Young and the Restless, Miguel Lopez-Fitzgerald on Passions, Ethan Whitehorse on The Lying Game, Tyler "Ty" Mendoza on Switched at Birth and Simon Waverly on Satisfaction and Thunderbird on The Gifted.

Early life
Redford grew up in the suburb of Canton, Georgia and attended Sequoyah High School. He is of Irish, French, German and Native American descent. He worked for several summers in Georgia's Renaissance Festival performing and doing stunts, creating a pirate character named "Rusty Compass." He is an avid tennis player, and turned down scholarships upon graduating high school in order to act.

Career
Redford got his start with a win in a Warner Bros. open call that granted him a seat as a team member of the WB Road Crew. After about a year and a half on the Road Crew, he moved to Los Angeles. After a short time there, he then landed the role of Scotty Grainger on the soap opera The Young and the Restless in July 2005, which he left in February 2006.

Redford later replaced Adrian Bellani in the role of the Latino character Miguel Lopez-Fitzgerald in the soap opera Passions from 2007 to 2008 when the show moved from NBC exclusively to DirectTV for its final season. Redford also landed the starring role of Nash Rambler in Gregg Bishop's horror-comedy film Dance of the Dead which was released by Sam Raimi's Ghost House Pictures and Lions Gate Entertainment.

Redford starred in The CW drama pilot Betwixt, which wasn't picked up to series, and also appeared in the third season of The CW's 90210 as a recurring character named Oscar. He played James, a Bumper Band member in the film Burlesque starring Cher and Christina Aguilera. In 2011, he appeared in five episodes of ABC Family's Switched at Birth as Tyler "Ty" Mendoza, then left the show to start filming for ABC Family's The Lying Game. He was in the series for two seasons before it was cancelled by the network. BuddyTV ranked him #17 on its list of "TV's Sexiest Men of 2011". He reprised his role in the second half of Switched at Birth'''s second season in summer 2013 and left to pursue other shows.

In September 2013, it was announced that Redford would guest star as Zach in the second season of Beauty & the Beast on The CW.
 
On March 19, 2014, it was reported that Redford had been cast in Satisfaction'' as Simon Waverly. The male escort drama series aired for two seasons on the USA Network.

Filmography

Film

Television

Video games

References

External links
 
 

1983 births
Male actors from Georgia (U.S. state)
American male soap opera actors
American male television actors
American people of Irish descent
American people of French descent
American people of German descent
American people who self-identify as being of Native American descent
Living people
People from Canton, Georgia